Cherokee High School or Cherokee School is a public school located in unincorporated Cherokee, Texas (USA), a small community in the west central portion of the state and classified as a 1A school by the UIL.  The school is part of the Cherokee Independent School District which encompasses southern San Saba County.  In 2015, the school was rated "Met Standard" by the Texas Education Agency.

Athletics
The Cherokee Indians compete in these sports - 

Cross Country, 6-Man Football, Basketball, Tennis, Golf & Track

State titles
Football - 
1973(6M), 1975(6M), 1978(6M)

State finalist
Football - 
1974(6M)

See also
 List of Six-man football stadiums in Texas

References

External links
Cherokee Independent School District
List of Six-man football stadiums in Texas

Schools in San Saba County, Texas
Public high schools in Texas